See Bananal for namesakes
The Territorial Prelature of Bananal was a short-lived (1924-1956) Latin Catholic pseudo-diocesan jurisdiction in Brazil.

History 
Established on 1924.07.04 as Territorial Prelature of Bananal, named after the Microregion of Bananal (in São Paulo state), where its territory was split off from the Diocese of Porto Nacional.

Suppressed on 1956.03.26, its territory being reassigned to the Diocese of Goiás, to which its last Prelate was transferred and promoted, and to establish the Territorial Prelature of Cristalândia.

Ordinaries 
(all Roman Rite)

It was initially vacant, with a single Apostolic Administrator : 
 Father Francesco Ozamiz Corta, Claretians (C.M.F.) (1926 – 1930), no other episcopal office; later Apostolic Administrator of the (still later suppressed) Territorial Prelature of São José de Alto Tocantins (1936 – 1937).

Its only proper episcopal Bishop-Prelate of Bananal'' was :
 Cândido Bento Maria Penso, Dominican Order (O.P.) (1947.06.19 – 1957.01.17), Titular Bishop of Cœla (1947.06.19 – 1957.01.17); later Bishop of Diocese of Goiás (Brazil) (1957.01.17 – death 1959.11.27).

External links and sources 
 GCatholic

Territorial prelatures
Former Roman Catholic dioceses in America